Selenginsky (masculine), Selenginskaya (feminine), or Selenginskoye (neuter) may refer to:
Selenginsky District, a district of the Republic of Buryatia, Russia
Selenginskoye Urban Settlement, a municipal formation which Selenginsk Urban-Type Settlement in Kabansky District of the Republic of Buryatia is incorporated as